Owk or OWK may refer to:
Owk, a mandal in Andhra Pradesh, India
Otto Wille Kuusinen, Finnish, later Soviet, politician
Other World Kingdom, a BDSM facility and micronation located within the Czech Republic
Obi-Wan Kenobi